Mutual Improvement Association or MIA can refer to

 Young Men (organization), a Latter-day Saints organisation formerly called the Young Men's Mutual Improvement Association
 Young Women (organization), a Latter-day Saints organisation formerly called the Young Ladies' National Mutual Improvement Association and the Young Women's Mutual Improvement Association
 In pre-WWI Australia, various secular and church-sponsored organizations founded to develop young men's skills in debating and public speaking. After 1914 the initials developed a more sinister meaning — Missing in Action.